KKFI is a radio station located in Kansas City, Missouri and owned by Mid-Coast Radio Project, Inc., a 501(c)(3) nonprofit.  Formed in 1988, it broadcasts at 100,000 watts on 90.1 FM.  Its music programming includes blues, jazz, reggae, rock, hip hop, alternative, Hispanic and world music.  Its local and national public affairs programming includes shows dealing with working class, organized labor, peace, justice, LGBT, women, and alternative health issues.

History
KKFI was inspired by the 1971 book, Sex and Broadcasting. It is owned and operated by Mid-Coast Radio Project, Inc., which was incorporated 1977-03-25. It received a license to broadcast in 1987.  Its first broadcast was 1988-02-28.

Location

KKFI's studios are located at 3901 Main St., Kansas City, MO 64111.

Its service area is roughly circular encompassing the Kansas City Metro Area.  It is routinely heard from most parts of Topeka, Kansas, in the west extending east almost to Marshall, Missouri.  The officially designated "local" area covers roughly half that distance

Affiliations

It is affiliated with the Pacifica radio network, the National Federation of Community Broadcasters, and the Grassroots Radio Coalition.  It is the Kansas City metropolitan area's home for Democracy Now!, the flagship program of the Pacifica Foundation.

See also
List of community radio stations in the United States
 List of Pacifica Radio stations and affiliates

References

External links 
Official Web Site
Listen to KKFI via 64kbps High Quality streaming audio
Listen to KKFI via 32kbps Low Quality streaming audio

KKFI History Site

KFI
Community radio stations in the United States
Radio stations established in 1988
1988 establishments in Missouri